Huddle is a surname. Notable people with the surname include:

David Huddle (born 1942), writer
Franklin Huddle (born 1943), diplomat who served as a consul and an ambassador
J. Klahr Huddle (1891–1959), United States Ambassador to Burma
Molly Huddle (born 1984), American distance runner